Alban Lakata (born 25 June 1979 in Lienz) is an Austrian cyclist. Specializing in marathon mountain biking, he won the world championships for the event in 2010, 2015 and 2017. He has also won the Leadville 100 race three times, and set the all-time course record in 2015. He also occasionally competes in road cycling, having entered the national road race championships several times, as well as the Pro Ötztaler 5500 in 2017.

Major results

2004
 3rd  European XCM Championships
 3rd National XCO Championships
2005
 3rd National XCO Championships
2007
 1st Black Forest Ultra Bike Marathon
2008
 1st  European XCM Championships
 1st  National XCM Championships
 3rd National XCO Championships
2009
 1st  National XCM Championships
 2nd  UCI World XCM Championships
2010
 1st  UCI World XCM Championships
 1st  National XCM Championships
 1st Roc d'Azur
 2nd National XCO Championships
2011
 1st  National XCM Championships
 2nd National XCO Championships
2012
 1st Leadville 100
 3rd  European XCM Championships
2013
 1st  European XCM Championships
 1st Leadville 100
 2nd  UCI World XCM Championships
2014
 2nd  UCI World XCM Championships
2015
 1st  UCI World XCM Championships
 1st  National XCM Championships
 1st Leadville 100
2016
 2nd  UCI World XCM Championships
 2nd National XCM Championships
2017
 1st  UCI World XCM Championships
 2nd  European XCM Championships
 3rd National XCM Championships
2018
 2nd National XCM Championships
2019
 2nd National XCM Championships
2020
 1st  National XCM Championships
2021
 1st  National XCM Championships

References

External links

Austrian male cyclists
Living people
1979 births
UCI Mountain Bike World Champions (men)
People from Lienz
Austrian mountain bikers
Cross-country mountain bikers
Sportspeople from Tyrol (state)